

Results

Men's under-23 cross-country